The Albanian Chess Championship is the annual individual national chess championship of Albania. The first tournament took place in 1933. A separate championship for women has been held since 1977.

Winners
{| class="sortable wikitable"
! Year !! Champion !! Women's Champion
|-
|	1933	||		||	
|-
|	1946	||		||	
|-
|	1947	||		||	
|-
|	1948	||				||	
|-
|	1949	||		||	
|-
|	1950	||		 	||	
|-
|	1951	||		||	
|-
|	1952	||		 	||	
|-
|	1953	||		||	
|-
|	1954	||		||	
|-
|	1955	||		||	
|-
|	1956	||		||	
|-
|	1957	||		||	
|-
|	1958	||		||	
|-
|	1959	||		||	
|-
|	1960	||		||	
|-
|	1961	||		||	
|-
|	1962	||		||	
|-
|	1963	||		||	
|-
|	1964	||		||	
|-
|	1965	||		||	
|-
|	1966	||		||	
|-
|	1967	||		||	
|-
|	1968	||		||	
|-
|	1969	||		||	
|-
|	1970	||		||	
|-
|	1971	||		||	
|-
|	1972	||		||	
|-
|	1973	||		||	
|-
|	1974	||		||	
|-
|	1975	||		||	
|-
|	1976	||		||	
|-
|	1977	||		||	
|-
|	1978	||		||	
|-
|	1979	||		||	
|-
|	1980	||		||	
|-
|	1981	||		||	
|-
|	1982	||		||	
|-
|	1983	||		||	
|-
|	1984	||		||	
|-
|	1985	||		||	
|-
|	1986	||		||	
|-
|	1987	||		||	
|-
|	1988	||		||	
|-
|	1989	||		||	
|-
|	1990	||		||	
|-
|	1991	||		||	
|-
|	1992	||		||	
|-
|	1993	||		||	
|-
|	1994	||		||	
|-
|	1995	||		||	
|-
|	1996	||		||	
|-
|	1997	||		||	
|-
|	1998	||		        ||	
|-
|	1999	||		||	
|-
|	2000	||		||	not played
|-
|	2001	||		||	
|-
|	2002	||		||	
|-
|	2003	||		||	
|-
|	2004	||		||	
|-
|	2005	||		||	
|-
|	2006	||		||	
|-
|	2007	||		||	
|-
|       2008    ||              ||      
|-
|       2009    ||              ||      
|-
|	2010	||		||	
|-
|	2011	||		||	
|-
|	2012	||		||	
|-
|	2013	||	||	
|-
|	2014	||	 ||	
|-
|	2015	||		||	
|-
|	2016	||		||	
|-
|	2017	||		||	
|-
|	2018	||		||	
|-
|2019
|
|
|-
|2020
|
|
|-
|2021
|
|
|-
|2022
|
|
|}

Open champions by number of titles

Women's champions by number of titles

Albanian clubs championship

Albanian women clubs championship 

National Spartakiadas

List of winners with respective teams included

External links
List of winners from the Italian sports journalist Giovanni Armillotta
Official Website of Albanian Chess Federation

Chess national championships
Women's chess national championships
Championship
Recurring sporting events established in 1933
1933 in chess
Chess
Recurring sporting events established in 1977
1977 in chess
Chess
Chess
Chess